Chelli may refer to:

People

Surname 
 Alida Chelli (1943–2012), Italian actress ;

Given name 
 Chelli Goldenberg (1954-),  Israeli actress.

See also 
 Chelly (disambiguation)